Kevin Sawchak (born November 16, 1988) is an American soccer coach and former player who currently serves as an assistant coach for MLS Next Pro side Crown Legacy.

Career statistics

Club

Notes

References

External links
 

Association football defenders
Association football midfielders
American soccer players
American expatriate soccer players
UAB Blazers men's soccer players
Atlanta Blackhawks players
Myllykosken Pallo −47 players
Ekenäs IF players
Kotkan Työväen Palloilijat players
FC Honka players
FC KooTeePee players
North American Soccer League players
Veikkausliiga players
Kakkonen players
Ykkönen players
Expatriate footballers in Finland
Soccer players from Atlanta
1988 births
Living people
American expatriate sportspeople in Finland
USL League One coaches
Northern Colorado Hailstorm FC
Chattanooga Red Wolves SC